Diocese of Lexington can refer to either of two dioceses of Lexington, Kentucky:

 Episcopal Diocese of Lexington, a diocese of the Episcopal Church in the United States of America
 Roman Catholic Diocese of Lexington, a diocese of the Roman Catholic Church